The Battle of Stołowicze was a battle of the War of the Bar Confederation.  It took place on the 23 September 1771 and ended with the defeat of Bar rebels by Russian general Alexander Suvorov.  Michał Kazimierz Ogiński, the Bar commander, was defeated and forced into a brief exile.

References 

Stolowicze
Stolowicze
Bar Confederation
Conflicts in 1771
1771 in Europe
Alexander Suvorov